Graham Harvey (born 23 April 1961) is a Scottish former footballer. He played as a forward for Hibernian, Dundee, Airdrieonians, Instant-Dict FC and Livingston.

References

External links

1961 births
Living people
Sportspeople from Musselburgh
Association football forwards
Scottish footballers
Scottish expatriate footballers
Expatriate footballers in Hong Kong
Hibernian F.C. players
Dundee F.C. players
Scottish expatriate sportspeople in Hong Kong
Airdrieonians F.C. (1878) players
Livingston F.C. players
Scottish Football League players
Double Flower FA players
Footballers from East Lothian
Bonnyrigg Rose Athletic F.C. players
Scottish Junior Football Association players
Hong Kong League XI representative players
Hong Kong First Division League players